"Sounds So Good" is a song written and recorded by American country music artist Ashton Shepherd.  It was released in May 2008 as the second single and title track from her debut album Sounds So Good.

Critical reception
Leeann Ward of Country Universe gave the song an A− grade, calling it "a more mainstream sounding song that relies more heavily on strong melody than lyrical strength." Matt C. of Engine 145 gave the song a "thumbs up," writing that "Shepherd lovingly sings her life’s soundtrack in a voice imbued with honest, lived experiences" and "her Alabama drawl makes every bent syllable even easier to believe."

Music video
The music video was directed by Roman White and premiered in June 2008.

Chart performance
The song debuted at number 56 on the U.S. Billboard Hot Country Songs chart for the week of May 31, 2008.

References

2008 singles
2007 songs
Ashton Shepherd songs
Music videos directed by Roman White
MCA Nashville Records singles
Song recordings produced by Buddy Cannon
Songs written by Ashton Shepherd